Starlight Station, New York, Ontario, and Western Railway, also known as Buckingham Township Municipal Building, is a historic railway station located at Buckingham Township, Wayne County, Pennsylvania.  It was built in 1889 as the New York, Ontario and Western Railway(O&W) was organizing its new Scranton division. Prior to arrival of the railroad, the local community had been known as Lizard Lake. The community's first post office was established in the new station comet and the new name “Starlight” was chosen by local residents from a book provided by the Postal Service. The station agent's wife was postmistress. 

During its heyday, the station was both the social and economic center of the community. Customers came in to send off letters and pick up their mail.  The station agent logged in freight dairy products, produce, and some other items seeing that they were properly transferred from the freight room and then to the appropriate railroad cars. He saw to the offloading of supplies for local customers. He sold tickets to neighbors leaving to visit friends or do business in a city, to vacationers returning to their city homes, and to salesmen using the railroad for business travel.  Meanwhile, local folks would come by to send off goods to the city, to pick up packages, to meet visitors or see them off on the train, or just to chat with friends and neighbors.

The building was in use as a passenger and freight station, as well as the station agent's residence, until 1933, when the Great Depression led to local business failures and the financial losses for the O& W. The station agent office was moved to nearby Lakewood station. Although no longer in use as an office, Starlight station was maintained as a railroad property, providing living quarters for the agent. The post office remained at the station until 1953, when the family moved out of their upstairs apartment and the post office was relocated. In 1957, with all its divisions closed down, the O&W was dissolved. Starlight stations set empty and unused. 

In 1968, Buckingham Township, in need of a municipal building, purchased it but the Township did not immediately have the funds to convert it for government purposes.  In 1976 they received grant money to renovate the building, adapting it for use as Township office and meeting space.  The freight room floor was removed to lower the surface to ground level and the exterior freight door was replaced with an overhead door converting the space for use as a garage.  A portion of the former stationmaster’s office was partitioned to create a restroom. In 2000 the municipality researched the station original exterior paint color, then painted it to the distinctive original mustard yellow, with dark green trim.

Comparison with early photographs of the building reveals that the footprint basic design and mass remain unaltered. Most original materials and distinctive details remain, including the stationmaster's ticket cage, wood floors, and complex siding. Despite changes made in the name of adaptive reuse, inside and out, the overall appearance retains its architectural integrity.

The former waiting room has been used as a space for Township meetings. The former post office area is now the Township office. The former freight room is a garage housing Township equipment. It was added to the National Register of Historic Places in 2001.

References

Railway stations on the National Register of Historic Places in Pennsylvania
Railway stations in the United States opened in 1889
Buildings and structures in Wayne County, Pennsylvania
National Register of Historic Places in Wayne County, Pennsylvania

Former railway stations in Pennsylvania
Former New York, Ontario and Western Railway stations